Pompey is a commune in the Meurthe-et-Moselle department in north-eastern France.

The population was 4,871 in 2018. It is an industrial town (mainly steel industry), at the confluence of the rivers Moselle and Meurthe.

Notable people 
 Nicolas-Antoine Nouet, born 1740 in Pompey, died 1811 in Chambéry, astronomer
 Marcel Le Bihan (1923-2009), resistant and former mayor of the commune
 Hubert Haenel (1942-2015), politician and a member of the Senate of France

Astronomy
The minor planet 18636 Villedepompey is named after the town.

See also
 Communes of the Meurthe-et-Moselle department

References

External links

 Town's website

Communes of Meurthe-et-Moselle